Enderson Daniel Franco (born December 29, 1992) is a Venezuelan professional baseball pitcher for the Fubon Guardians of the Chinese Professional Baseball League (CPBL). He has played in Major League Baseball (MLB) for the San Francisco Giants and in the KBO League (KBO) for the Lotte Giants. Franco was signed as an international free agent by the Houston Astros in 2009. He made his MLB debut in 2019.

Career

Houston Astros
Franco was signed as an international free agent by the Houston Astros on July 4, 2009. He spent the 2010 with the DSL Astros, going 1–3 with a 3.67 ERA in 34 innings. He spent the 2011 season with the Gulf Coast Astros, going 1–2 with a 4.40 ERA in 47 innings. He returned to the GCL Astros in 2012, going 3–2 with a 4.86 ERA in 50 innings. In 2013, he played for the Greeneville Astros, going 2–5 with a 5.05 ERA in 51.2 innings.

Tampa Bay Rays
Franco selected by the Tampa Bay Rays in the Triple-A phase of the 2013 Rule 5 draft. He played for the Hudson Valley Renegades in 2014, going 7–3 with a 3.28 ERA in 68.2 innings. He opened the 2015 season with the Bowling Green Hot Rods, going 5–6 with a 3.89 ERA in 71.2 innings.

Miami Marlins
On July 3, 2015, Franco was traded to the Miami Marlins in exchange for international bonus slots.  He finished the 2015 season with Greensboro Grasshoppers, going 1–6 with 7.29 ERA in 54 innings.

Atlanta Braves
Franco was selected by the Atlanta Braves in the minor-league phase of 2015 Rule 5 draft. He played for the Carolina Mudcats in 2016, going 6–12 with a 4.69 ERA in 144 innings (3rd in the Carolina League). Franco was selected as a member of the Venezuela national baseball team at the 2017 World Baseball Classic. He split the 2017 season between the Rome Braves, Florida Fire Frogs, and the Gwinnett Braves, going 6–6 with a 3.86 ERA in 120 innings. He split the 2018 season between the Mississippi Braves and the Gwinnett Stripers, going a combined 7–9 with a 3.85 ERA in 132 innings.

San Francisco Giants
Franco elected free agency following the 2018 season, and signed a minor league with the San Francisco Giants on January 24, 2019. He spent the 2019 minor league season with the Sacramento River Cats, going 6–5 with a 5.97 ERA in 113 innings.

On September 15, 2019, the Giants selected Franco's contract and promoted him to the major leagues. He made his major league debut on September 18 versus the Boston Red Sox, allowing one run over one inning of relief. In 2019 in five relief appearances for the Giants, he pitched 5.1 innings and had a 3.38 ERA. On June 30, 2020, Franco was outrighted off of the 40-man roster. He did not play in a game in 2020 due to the cancellation of the minor league season because of the COVID-19 pandemic. He became a free agent on November 2, 2020.

Lotte Giants
On November 21, 2020, Franco signed a $245K contract with the Lotte Giants of the KBO League. The contract also includes a $55K signing bonus. He made his KBO debut on April 6, 2021. Franco became a free agent following the season.

Generales de Durango
On March 2, 2022, Franco signed with the Generales de Durango of the Mexican League. In 6 starts, he posted a 0–3 record with a 9.85 ERA over 28.1 innings pitched. Franco was released on May 25, 2022.

Fubon Guardians
On June 17, 2022, Franco signed with the Fubon Guardians of the Chinese Professional Baseball League.

See also
Rule 5 draft results

References

External links

1992 births
Living people
Bowling Green Hot Rods players
Carolina Mudcats players
Dominican Summer League Astros players
Venezuelan expatriate baseball players in the Dominican Republic
Florida Fire Frogs players
Generales de Durango players
Greeneville Astros players
Greensboro Grasshoppers players
Gulf Coast Astros players
Gwinnett Braves players
Gwinnett Stripers players
Hudson Valley Renegades players
Lotte Giants players
Major League Baseball pitchers
Major League Baseball players from Venezuela
Mississippi Braves players
Navegantes del Magallanes players
People from Anzoátegui
Rome Braves players
Sacramento River Cats players
San Francisco Giants players
Venezuelan expatriate baseball players in Mexico
Venezuelan expatriate baseball players in South Korea
Venezuelan expatriate baseball players in the United States
World Baseball Classic players of Venezuela
2017 World Baseball Classic players
Fubon Guardians players
Venezuelan expatriate baseball players in Taiwan